This is a list of aircraft type numbers allocated by an institution under the direction of Heereswaffenamt (before May 1933) and the Reich Air Ministry (RLM) between 1933 and 1945 for German military and civilian aircraft and in parallel to the  list of German aircraft engines. See RLM aircraft designation system for an explanation of how these numbers were used.

There is no single "master list" applicable all the way from 1933 to 1945 - numbers were occasionally duplicated, reallocated, or re-used. Sources differ on the allocations.

Listing

0-100

101-200

201-300

301-400

401-

See also 
 RLM numbering system for gliders and sailplanes
 Japanese military aircraft designation systems

Notes

References
Heinz J. Nowarra's Die deutsche Luftrüstung 1933-1945 ("German Air Armament 1933-1945")

RLM
RLM aircraft designations, List of
RLM